SM Babar Ali is a Awami League politician and the former Member of Parliament of Khulna-9.

Career
Ali was elected to parliament from Khulna-9 as an Awami League candidate in 1973.

References

Awami League politicians
Living people
1st Jatiya Sangsad members
Year of birth missing (living people)